Orantes may refer to the following people:
Given name
Orantes Grant (born 1978), American football linebacker

Surname
César Amín González Orantes (born 1961), Mexican politician
Hernán Orantes López (born 1968), Mexican politician
Justine Wong-Orantes (born 1995), American Olympic volleyball player
Manuel Orantes (born 1949), Spanish tennis player
María Elena Orantes López (born 1968), Mexican politician, relative of Hernán